Alexander Valerievich Perezhogin (born August 10, 1983) is a Kazakhstani-Russian professional ice hockey player who is currently an unrestricted free agent. He most recently played for Avangard Omsk of the Kontinental Hockey League (KHL).

Playing career
Perezhogin began his playing career in his homeland of Kazakhstan before leaving in 1998, with his coach Sergei Gersonsky, to play for Avangard Omsk's farm team Avangard VDV. He would then gain Russian citizenship upon his recruitment. Perezhogin remained with the Omsk organization for the remainder of his Russian league career prior to being drafted.

Perezhogin was drafted by the Montreal Canadiens in the first round of the 2001 NHL Entry Draft, 25th overall. In the 2003-04 season, Perezhogin came to North America to play with the Hamilton Bulldogs, Montreal's American Hockey League (AHL) affiliate. He played with the Montreal Canadiens for two seasons.

During Perezhogin's suspension from the AHL for his stick-swinging incident on Garrett Stafford, on the advice of Bob Gainey and the Montreal Canadiens, he re-joined his former team, Avangard Omsk of the Russian Superleague (RSL), and scored 33 points in 43 games. In total, Perezhogin tallied 55 points in 95 games in his career with Avangard.

He scored his first NHL goal on a break-away in his first career game, on October 6, 2005, at Madison Square Garden against New York Rangers goaltender Kevin Weekes.

On May 8, 2007, Perezhogin signed a contract with Salavat Yulayev Ufa of the Russian Superleague. He would earn nearly $1.8 million US, almost three times his NHL salary during the 2006-07 season. The Montreal Canadiens still hold his NHL rights as he is a restricted free agent.

In April 2009, Perezhogin was invited to represent Russia in the 2009 IIHF World Championship hosted in Switzerland, where he played along the sides of Russian NHL superstars such as Ilya Kovalchuk and five of his teammates from Salavat Yulaev Ufa. Russia won its second consecutive gold medal against Canada on May 10, 2009.

In April 2010, Perezhogin was traded to once again join his former team, Avangard Omsk, with Salavat Yulaev Ufa receiving Igor Volkov in return.

Stick swinging incident
On April 30, 2004, during the 2004 Calder Cup playoffs against the Cleveland Barons, Perezhogin was cross-checked in the face by Garrett Stafford, with both players falling to the ice. While both were trying to get back up, Stafford swung his stick at Perezhogin's head making contact with his helmet. In response, while getting up, Perezhogin turned around and swung his stick in an axe swinging, almost chopping fashion and caught Stafford, who was still getting up, in the face.

The consequent blow knocked Stafford unconscious, and into convulsions. Stafford required twenty stitches, lost some teeth and was diagnosed with a concussion. He was released the next day from Hamilton General Hospital and has since made a full recovery. Perezhogin was suspended for the rest of the playoffs, and in an unprecedented move for the entire following AHL season of 2004–05. Perezhogin was also charged by Hamilton Police Service, and was given a one-year probation, ordered to donate $5,000 to charity, and to cover all of Stafford's medical bills.

Perezhogin actually did play pro hockey in 2004–05, but in the Russian Superleague with Avangard. He returned to Hamilton for the 2005–06 season. He was called up to the Montreal Canadiens that season and played 67 games for the Habs. Since 2007, however, he returned to Russia, playing for Salavat Yulaev Ufa of the KHL.

Career statistics

Regular season and playoffs

International

References

External links
 
 

1983 births
Living people
Avangard Omsk players
Hamilton Bulldogs (AHL) players
Montreal Canadiens draft picks
Montreal Canadiens players
National Hockey League first-round draft picks
Sportspeople from Oskemen
Russian ice hockey right wingers
Salavat Yulaev Ufa players
Zauralie Kurgan players
Kazakhstani ice hockey right wingers
Russian expatriate sportspeople in Canada
Expatriate ice hockey players in Canada
Russian expatriate ice hockey people
Kazakhstani emigrants to Russia